Marcos Llunas  is a Spanish singer-songwriter, known in Spain and Latin America. His debut single "Para reconquistarte" reached the No.1 spot all over Hispanic America. He is also known for his successful participation in the 1997 Eurovision Song Contest. Llunas is the father of the singer turned actor Spanish Izan Llunas.

Llunas, son of Spanish singer Dyango, released his self-titled first album in 1993. His biggest hit was "Para reconquistarte", it became a smash-hit all over Hispanic America during the whole 1993, it peaked at the number one position and spent several weeks at the top in Argentina, Mexico, Chile and Uruguay. He later recorded several moderately successful singles, and in 1995, in Paraguay, won the OTI Song Festival for Spain with the song "Eres mi debilidad". Llunas, was nominated for a Lo Nuestro Award for Pop New Artist of the Year at the 7th Lo Nuestro Awards.

In 1997, Llunas was chosen internally by broadcaster Televisión Española as the Spanish representative for the 42nd Eurovision Song Contest with his self-penned song "Sin rencor" ("No Hard Feelings").  At the contest, held in Dublin on 3 May, "Sin rencor" finished in sixth place of the 25 entries.

In the years following his Eurovision appearance, Llunas recorded in Portuguese and Catalan in addition to Spanish, and became particularly successful in Latin American markets.  He released a career retrospective album in 2004. Between 2002 and 2007 he made appearances as a juror on Spanish television talent shows Operación Triunfo and Lluvia de estrellas.

In 2007, he was one of the contestants on the Mexican talent show Disco de oro, a competition between successful singers from different decades that aired on TV Azteca.

In 2012, he released an album that paid tribute to his father Dyango.

 Albums discography 
1993: Marcos Llunas1994: Piel a Piel1996: Vida1997: Mi Historia1999: Pluja d'estels1999: Desnudo2002: Me gusta2003: Hechicera2004: Mi retrato2012: La voz del alma: Marcos Llunas a Dyango''

References 

 

Eurovision Song Contest entrants for Spain
Eurovision Song Contest entrants of 1997
Living people
21st-century Spanish singers
21st-century Spanish male singers
Year of birth missing (living people)